Sidonia Hedwig Zäunemann (15 January 1711 – 11 December 1740), known as die Zäunemännin, was a German poet.  Zäunemann was inspired by the example of Christiana Mariana von Ziegler. She became Poet Laureate of Göttingen at the age of twenty-four.

Selected works
 Das Ilmenauische Bergwerk ... (The Mine at Ilmenau) (1737)

Further reading
 Bloomsbury Guide to Women's Literature

External links
 
 

1711 births
1740 deaths
Writers from Erfurt
People from the Electorate of Mainz
German women poets
University of Göttingen alumni
18th-century German women writers